Freeman Osonuga is a Nigerian medical doctor, entrepreneur, Chief Executive Officer of Adloyalty Business Network (AdloyaltyBN), and founder PropTech Hub Africa Inc. He gained recognition when he volunteered as part of the African Union response team during the Ebola virus epidemic in Sierra Leone in 2014. He also founded the Dr. Freeman Osonuga Foundation (DFO), a charitable organization to support orphans and people with disabilities in Nigeria.

Background and recognition
Freeman was born the youngest of six children in Ijebu-Ode, Ogun State. He studied Medicine and Surgery at Olabisi Onabanjo University. He is a Tech investor and a skydiver. In 2013, he was named a One Young World Ambassador. A year later, he received a Sierra Leone Government's Presidential Meritorious Service Award for his role in the containment of the Ebola virus in Sierra Leone.

In June 2015, he was named a Wired UK's Innovation Fellow, and in October that year, he was among three finalists shortlisted to travel to space.

In 2016, he established Adloyalty Business Networks, a real estate network marketing firm. The firm was reported to have hit 20,000 realtors in February 2020 and was described as "Nigeria's first and biggest independent real estate network marketing firm" by The Guardian.

In 2017, he was listed as one of the 100 Most Influential Young Nigerians and was selected as one of Nigeria's Top 10 Real Estate Disruptors of 2020. In September 2020, Freeman was appointed as a Senator representing Nigeria by the World Business Angels Investment Forum (WBAF), an affiliated partner of the G20 Global Partnership for Financial Inclusion (GPFI).

Books 
Freeman has published two books, including the following:
 Print Money With Zero Capital
 The Business Game

Personal life 
Freeman is married to Damilola Osonuga, and they live together in Lagos with their daughter.

References 

Living people
1984 births
21st-century Nigerian medical doctors
Nigerian social entrepreneurs
Olabisi Onabanjo University alumni
Medical doctors from Ogun State